Raising Sand is a collaborative studio album by rock singer Robert Plant and bluegrass-country singer Alison Krauss. It was released in October 2007 by Rounder Records. Raising Sand won Album of the Year at the 2008 Americana Music Honors & Awards and at the 2009 Grammy Awards.

Reception
{{Album ratings
| MC = 87/100
| rev1 = Allmusic
| rev1Score = <ref name="AM">

The album met with critical acclaim, earning an average score of 87 from reviews compiled by Metacritic. It ranked at #24 on Rolling Stone'''s December 17, 2007 listing of the year's top 50 albums. Being There called it "one of the year’s very best". Allmusic hailed it "one of the most effortless-sounding pairings in modern popular music", but stated that some songs "(felt) like (they were) tossed off".
JamBase called the album "subtle, focused and full of life" and said that it was "highly recommended". Village Voice described it as "powerfully evocative" and "utterly foreign, oddly familiar, and deeply gratifying."

The songs on Raising Sand were handpicked by producer T Bone Burnett. Entertainment Weekly described the selection as "eclectic", while Village Voice said, "Burnett flaunts his typical curatorial genius with a whole set of 'have we met before?' tunes."

The musical quality was also praised. The BBC described Krauss's fiddle as "coruscating" and "raw", while The Music Box said Krauss "exceeds all expectations". The BBC said the musicians "make this a stunning, dark, brooding collection, comparable in tone to Daniel Lanois' masterful job on Dylan's Time Out of Mind."

Critics praised Krauss and Plant's vocals; one critic saying that the "key to the magic is the delicious harmony vocals of the unlikely duo". Various critics described Krauss's vocals as "spellbinding", "honey-sweet", "weepy", "saccharine", and "haunting". Plant's vocals were described as "orgasmic" and "slithering".

"Gone, Gone, Gone (Done Moved On)" was released as a single and won the Best Pop Collaboration with Vocals at the 50th Grammy Awards and was nominated for the Americana Award for "Song of the Year". The song "Killing the Blues" was #51 on Rolling Stones list of the 100 Best Songs of 2007.

On February 8, 2009, the album won all five awards for which it was nominated at the 51st Grammy Awards: Album of the Year; Best Contemporary Folk/Americana Album; Record of the Year (for "Please Read the Letter"); Best Pop Collaboration with Vocals (for "Rich Woman"); and Best Country Collaboration with Vocals (for "Killing the Blues"). Raising Sand was the second of four country albums to win Album of the Year, following Dixie Chicks's Taking the Long Way and preceding Taylor Swift's Fearless and Kacey Musgraves' Golden Hour.

The album was nominated for the 2008 Mercury Prize in the UK.

In December 2009, Rhapsody ranked the album #2 on its "Country’s Best Albums of the Decade" list. The online music service also called it one of their favorite cover albums of all time.

"Raising Sand is my album of the century," said singer Lily Allen. "I love the whole folky and bluegrass sound. There's one track called 'Sister Rosetta Goes Before Us', which sounds like an epic funeral march: it's haunting and spooky, and Alison Krauss's voice can just make you shiver. Then there's 'Please Read the Letter', which just has such an honest and open sentiment, it's disarming. I'd love to do an album like that."

Chart performance
The album debuted at number two on the Billboard 200, selling about 112,000 copies in its first week, the highest chart position for either artists' solo work, although Plant had previously reached #1 several times with Led Zeppelin. Raising Sand was certified platinum by the RIAA on March 4, 2008."Alison Krauss/Robert Plant go platinum". Country Standard Time. March 20, 2008. Retrieved March 27, 2008. After the album's success at the 2009 Grammy Awards, the album topped the Billboard Top Rock Albums chart and Top Internet Albums chart for the first time on the week of February 28, 2009. The album also hit the top of Canadian Top Country Albums, and also peaked at #2 in Billboard Top Country Albums, being stuck behind part of 35 weeks non-consecutive chart topping Fearless by country singer Taylor Swift. Selling 77,000 copies on a 715% increase, Raising Sand jumped 69–2 on the Billboard 200.

The album entered the Top 5 on the UK Albums Chart, going on to reach #2 on January 2, 2008.

Follow-up album
According to Ken Irwin of Rounder Records, and producer Burnett, the duo started work on a second album in 2009.

"To be 61 and faced with the 'difficult second album' is quite a phenomenon…" Plant observed in 2009. "We'd finished everything in ten days in Nashville, and I rented a car and went down the Natchez Trace to Oxford, Mississippi, across to Clarksdale and down into Helena, Arkansas, looking for those ghosts… and thought to myself, 'How can this be? I've just been with complete strangers, recorded 12 amazing tracks, had a fantastic time, and now I'm headed for the Mississippi Delta.'"

In a 2010 interview, Plant indicated that the follow-up sessions were unsuccessful.

Krauss and Plant released a new album produced by Burnett, Raise the Roof, on November 19, 2021.

Track listing

Personnel

Alison Krauss – vocals, fiddle
Robert Plant – vocals

Additional musicians
Norman Blake – acoustic guitar
Greg Leisz – pedal steel guitar
Marc Ribot – acoustic guitar, banjo, dobro, electric guitar
T Bone Burnett – acoustic and electric guitars, six-string bass guitar
Riley Baugus – banjo
Mike Seeger – autoharp on Your Long Journey'' 
Dennis Crouch – upright bass
Patrick Warren – keyboards, pump organ, piano
Jay Bellerose – drums

Production
T Bone Burnett – production
Gavin Lurssen – mastering engineering
Stacy Parrish – audio engineering
Mike Piersante – audio engineering, mixing

Charts

Weekly charts

Year-end charts

Certifications

References

External links
Official media site

2007 albums
Albums produced by T Bone Burnett
Alison Krauss & Union Station albums
Covers albums
Folk rock albums by American artists
Folk rock albums by British artists
Grammy Award for Album of the Year
Robert Plant albums
Rounder Records albums
Vocal duet albums
Zoë Records albums